Cetrimonium, cetyl trimethylammonium, or hexadecyltrimethylammonium is a quaternary ammonium cation whose salts are used as antiseptics:

 Cetrimonium bromide 
 Cetrimonium chloride 

Antiseptics
Quaternary ammonium compounds